Kuzma is a Slavic-language surname. Notable people with this surname include:
Csaba Kuzma (born 1954), Hungarian boxer
Eddie Kuzma (1911–1996), American auto racing builder
Kamil Kuzma (born 1988), Slovak footballer
Kim Kuzma, Canadian musician
Kyle Kuzma (born 1995), American basketball player
Marek Kuzma (born 1988), Slovak footballer
Nora Kuzma or Traci Lords, American actress

See also